Rob Dumas (born March 19, 1969) is a Canadian retired professional roller hockey defenceman. He played 71 games in Roller Hockey International, and scored 30 goals, and 64 assists with the Vancouver Voodoo, and Orlando Jackals. Dumas also had a 13 season minor league career, and was drafted in the 9th round (180th overall) of the 1987 NHL Entry Draft by the St. Louis Blues. Dumas is currently the general manager for the CDA Hockey Academy in Coeur D'Alene, Idaho.

Rollerhockey statistics

Ice hockey statistics

References

External links

1969 births
Living people
Canadian expatriate ice hockey players in England
Canadian ice hockey defencemen
Cleveland Lumberjacks players
Fresno Falcons players
Greensboro Monarchs players
Ice hockey people from Alberta
Idaho Steelheads (WCHL) players
Knoxville Cherokees players
Milton Keynes Kings players
Milwaukee Admirals (IHL) players
Nashville Knights players
Orlando Jackals players
Peoria Rivermen (IHL) players
St. Louis Blues draft picks
Seattle Breakers players
Seattle Thunderbirds players
Spokane Chiefs players
Tacoma Sabercats players
Tallahassee Tiger Sharks players
Vancouver VooDoo players